Natalie Renée McIntyre (born September 6, 1967), known by her stage name Macy Gray, is an American R&B and soul singer and actress. She is known for her distinctive raspy voice and a singing style heavily influenced by Billie Holiday.

Gray has released ten studio albums, and received five Grammy Award nominations, winning one. She has appeared in a number of films, including Training Day, Spider-Man, Scary Movie 3, Lackawanna Blues, Idlewild, For Colored Girls, and The Paperboy. Gray is best known for her international hit single "I Try", taken from her multi-platinum debut album On How Life Is.

Early life
Natalie McIntyre was born in Canton, Ohio, the daughter of Laura McIntyre, a math schoolteacher, and Otis Jones  . Her stepfather was a steelworker, and her sister is a biology teacher. She has a younger brother, Nate, who owns a gym in West Philadelphia and was featured on the season five finale of Queer Eye. She began piano lessons at age seven. A childhood bicycle mishap resulted in her noticing a mailbox of a man named Macy Gray; she used the name in stories she wrote and later decided to use it as her stage name. She was late developing and did not learn to hold conversation until just before her tenth birthday.

Gray attended school with Brian Warner (later known as musician Marilyn Manson) although they did not know each other. She attended more than one high school, including a boarding school which asked her to leave due to her behavior.

She attended the University of Southern California and studied scriptwriting.

Musical career

While attending the University of Southern California, she agreed to write songs for a friend. A demo session was scheduled for the songs to be recorded by another singer, but the vocalist failed to appear, so Gray recorded them herself. 

She then met writer-producer Joe Solo while working as a cashier in Beverly Hills. Together, they wrote a collection of songs and recorded them in Solo's studio. The demo tape gave Gray the opportunity to sing at jazz cafés in Los Angeles. Although Gray did not consider her unusual voice desirable for singing, Atlantic Records signed her. She began recording her debut record but was dropped from the label upon the departure of A&R man Tom Carolan, who had signed her to the label. Macy returned to Ohio but in 1997 Los Angeles based Zomba Label Group Senior VP A&R man Jeff Blue, convinced her to return to music and signed her to a development deal, recording new songs based on her life experiences, with a new sound, and began shopping her to record labels. In 1998, she landed a record deal with Epic Records. She performed on "Love Won't Wait", a song on the Black Eyed Peas' debut album Behind the Front.

1999–2001: On How Life Is
Gray worked on her debut album in 1999 with producer Darryl Swann. Released in the summer of 1999, On How Life Is became a worldwide smash. The first single, "Do Something", stalled on the charts, but the second single, "I Try", made the album a success. "I Try" (which was originally featured in Love Jones and the Jennifer Aniston-starring romantic-comedy Picture Perfect in 1997) was one of the biggest singles of 1999, and subsequent singles ("Still" and "Why Didn't You Call Me") ensured the album became triple platinum in the US and quadruple platinum in the UK.

In 2001, Gray won the Grammy Award for Best Female Pop Vocal Performance for "I Try", which was also nominated for "song of the year" and "record of the year". She then collaborated with Fatboy Slim, the Black Eyed Peas, and Slick Rick (on the song "The World Is Yours", from the Rush Hour 2 soundtrack), as well as acting for the first time, in the thriller Training Day. In August 2001, Gray was booed at the Pro Football Hall of Fame exhibition game after forgetting the lyrics to the American national anthem.

2001–2005: The Id and The Trouble with Being Myself

Gray's The Id featured appearances by John Frusciante and Erykah Badu on the single "Sweet Baby" (which was co-written with longtime collaborator Joe Solo). The album peaked at number eleven on the Billboard 200. It fared even better in the UK, where it reached number one on the UK Albums Chart and was certified gold by the BPI.

In 2002, she appeared in Spider-Man and contributed a remix of her song "My Nutmeg Phantasy" to its accompanying soundtrack. Gray also worked with Santana on the track "Amoré (Sexo)", for his album Shaman.

Also in 2002, she appeared on the Red Hot Organization's compilation CD in tribute to Nigerian Afropop pioneer Fela Kuti, Red Hot and Riot. She appeared on a remake of Kuti's classic track "Water No Get Enemy" alongside prominent neo soul, hip hop and R&B artists, D'Angelo, the Soultronics, Nile Rodgers, Roy Hargrove, and Kuti's son, Femi Kuti.

She recorded a duet with Zucchero called "Like the Sun (From Out of Nowhere)", which featured Jeff Beck on guitar released in 2004 on Zu & Co., a duet collection. Her song "Time of My Life" was included in the soundtrack to 8 Mile. A cartoon based on Gray's childhood was being developed, but it never came to fruition.

In 2003, Gray released her third studio album, The Trouble with Being Myself, to rave reviews. The lead single, "When I See You", became a radio hit in the US and a top-forty hit in the UK, although the album was not as well received by fans. Nevertheless, it became Gray's third top twenty album in the UK. A greatest hits collection and a live album were subsequently released: The Very Best of Macy Gray (2004) and Live in Las Vegas (2005). Additionally, Gray was featured on Marcus Miller's 2005 album Silver Rain, on a cover of Prince's 1986 song "Girls & Boys". She also appeared on the soundtrack to the film Chicago with Queen Latifah and Lil' Kim on "Cell Block Tango/He Had it Comin'".

2007–2010: Return to music and Big

Gray began 2007 by being kicked off-stage at a concert in Barbados for profanity (which was part of the show), but she was not aware that it was against the law in that country. She gave a public apology that night to avoid arrest.

In March, Gray released her fourth studio album (sixth overall), Big. Two singles, "Finally Made Me Happy" and "Shoo Be Doo", were released from the album. "What I Gotta Do", another track from the album, is featured on the Shrek the Third soundtrack. It has been considered Gray's comeback album, after a four-year hiatus since her last studio album. The album was critically acclaimed and seen by some as her best work to date. It features collaborations with Natalie Cole, Fergie, Justin Timberlake, and will.i.am, who co-executive produced the album with Gray. It was moderately successful in the US, where it debuted and peaked at number 39 on the Billboard 200, becoming Gray's highest-charting album since The Id. Big reached number 62 on the albums chart in the UK, her lowest-charting UK album, but it achieved some success in several other countries, including Switzerland, the Czech Republic, and Finland, reaching the Top 40 on their album charts.

PBS's Soundstage live concert series premiered a Gray concert on July 5.

On July 7, 2007, Gray performed at the Brazilian leg of Live Earth at Copacabana Beach in Rio de Janeiro, Brazil. Gray and her band members wore clothes bearing political messages. Gray's dress carried the message "Darfur Red Alert".

In 2008, Gray launched a new campaign under the name "Nemesis Jaxson", with the single "Slap a Bitch".

Early in 2009, Gray recorded the song "Don't Forget Me" for the soundtrack of Confessions of a Shopaholic.

2010–2011: The Sellout
The first single from Gray's fifth studio album The Sellout, "Beauty in the World", is featured in the final sequence of the series finale, "Hello Goodbye", of the ABC television series, Ugly Betty. "Beauty in the World" was also used as the theme in multiple videos created by Microsoft to promote Internet Explorer 9. Both singles released from the album ("Beauty in the World" and "Lately") were top 10 hits on the US Billboard Hot Dance Club Songs Chart.

Upon its release, The Sellout received generally mixed reviews from most music critics. Metacritic gave it an average score of 57, based on 15 reviews; Andy Gill of The Independent gave it three out of five stars; while AllMusic writer John Bush shared a similar sentiment and panned Gray's songwriting.

However, The Boston Globes James Reed commended its production, and Jeremy Allen of NME gave the album a 7/10 rating.

2011–2015: Covered, Talking Book, and The Way

In 2011, Gray signed a deal with 429 Records and started recording a series of covers for her next studio album Covered. The album was officially released on March 26, 2012. The album's first single was "Here Comes the Rain Again" (originally performed by Eurythmics). On February 16, 2012, Gray participated in the Sanremo Festival as a guest, performing alongside Gigi D'Alessio and Loredana Bertè.

For the 40th anniversary of the 1972 Stevie Wonder album Talking Book, Gray covered the entire record and released her Talking Book as a tribute.

In an interview with Oprah Winfrey's Where Are They Now, Gray opened up about her problems with drug abuse, stating that she was ill-prepared for the level of fame she received. The interview coincided with the release of her album The Way, released in October 2014 on Kobalt Records. A world tour was announced shortly after its release.

2016–present: Stripped and Ruby
In 2016, Gray's career continued with an album produced by Chesky Records, the record label founded by Grammy-nominated composer and musician David Chesky. Stripped was released September 9, 2016, and garnered unanimous praise from critics. The album debuted at No. 3 on the Billboard Jazz Chart. Earlier that year, she was featured on Ariana Grande's song "Leave Me Lonely" from her third studio album, Dangerous Woman.

Gray release her tenth studio album entitled Ruby in September 2018.

Other work
In 2001, she was the voice for Seeiah Owens in the video game SSX Tricky. Gray sang the theme song for the Nickelodeon animated series As Told by Ginger, composed by Jared Faber and Emily Kapnek. Gray also performed the song on the short-lived UPN romantic comedy Second Time Around starring Boris Kodjoe and Nicole Ari Parker in 2004. In 2006 Gray appeared in the eighth season of Bravo's Celebrity Poker Showdown, playing for Habitat for Humanity. She finished in third place.

In August 2008, Gray headlined at the 2008 Summer Sundae music festival in Leicester, England, performing cover versions of Rod Stewart's "Do Ya Think I'm Sexy?", Deee-Lite's "Groove Is in the Heart" and Radiohead's "Creep". For the gig, her band wore pink Andy Warhol wigs. On September 28, 2008, Gray sang the American national anthem as part of the Israeli flag-raising ceremony at the Israeli consulate of Los Angeles. Also in 2008, Gray collaborated with Australian DJ and singer Kaz James on the song "Can't Hold Back". The single was released in early 2009 in Australia and is credited to Kaz James featuring Macy Gray.In 2009, Gray briefly competed in season 9 of Dancing with the Stars with professional partner Jonathan Roberts. They were eliminated in a double elimination in week one. In 2012, she performed the Michael Jackson song "Rock with You" for a special performance of the West End musical Thriller – Live for BBC Children in Need Pop Goes the Musical.

In 2015, Gray was featured on the song "Into the Deep" by Galactic. In 2016, Gray was featured on the song "Leave Me Lonely" by Ariana Grande. In 2018, Gray was featured alongside Dolly Parton on a re-recording of "Two Doors Down" for the [[Dumplin' (soundtrack)|Dumplin soundtrack]]. In 2020, Gray was featured on the single "Out Of Love" by Canadian band Busty and the Bass. The band also released a notable cover of Gray's "I Try" in 2016.

In 2021, Gray competed in season three of the Australian version of The Masked Singer as "Atlantis". On February 20, 2022, Gray performed The Star-Spangled Banner at the 2022 NBA All-Star Game. Gray represented her home state of Ohio at the 2022 America Song Contest with the song "Every Night".

Personal life
Gray was married to Tracy Hinds, a mortgage broker, for about two years, but they divorced prior to her rise to prominence. They have three children: Aanisah, Mel, and Happy.

She opened the Macy Gray Music Academy in 2005.

In a July 2022 interview on Piers Morgan Uncensored, Gray was asked how she would define a woman, to which she answered "boobs and a vagina". She went on to state that she did not support the inclusion of transgender women in women's sports. In the days following the interview, she said that her words had been misunderstood, along with rejecting criticism she had received online for her views. In a subsequent appearance on the Today television show, she stated that "being a woman is a vibe".

In an opinion piece published in MarketWatch in June 2021, Gray called for a redesign of the United States flag stating that it "no longer represents democracy and freedom". Her suggestions included two additional stars for Washington, D.C. and Puerto Rico, the white stripes to be recolored off-white and the stars to be given a variety of colors.

DiscographyStudio albums'''On How Life Is (1999)The Id (2001)The Trouble with Being Myself (2003)Big (2007)The Sellout (2010)Covered (2012)Talking Book (2012) The Way (2014)Stripped (2016)Ruby'' (2018)

Filmography

Film

Television

Video games

Awards and nominations
Gray won five of seventeen nominations, including Grammy Awards, MTV Video Music Awards and Brit Awards.

References

External links

 
 

1967 births
Living people
African-American record producers
Record producers from Ohio
African-American women singer-songwriters
American video game actresses
Ballad musicians
Brit Award winners
Geffen Records artists
Grammy Award winners
Actresses from Ohio
Singer-songwriters from Ohio
Participants in American reality television series
Musicians from Canton, Ohio
USC School of Cinematic Arts alumni
Atlantic Records artists
Epic Records artists
Concord Records artists
African-American actresses
American television actresses
American film actresses
American voice actresses
Actors from Canton, Ohio
American contemporary R&B singers
20th-century American women singers
21st-century American women singers
American women record producers
Western Reserve Academy alumni
Mack Avenue Records artists
American neo soul singers
20th-century American singers
21st-century American singers
20th-century African-American women singers
21st-century African-American women singers
American Song Contest contestants